Tajikistan, officially the Republic of Tajikistan, is a landlocked country in Central Asia. Its capital and largest city is Dushanbe. It is bordered by Afghanistan to the south, Uzbekistan to the west, Kyrgyzstan to the north, and China to the east. It is separated narrowly from Pakistan by Afghanistan's Wakhan Corridor. The traditional homelands of the Tajiks include present-day Tajikistan as well as parts of Afghanistan and Uzbekistan.

The territory that now constitutes Tajikistan was previously home to several ancient cultures, including the city of Sarazm of the Neolithic and the Bronze Age and was later home to kingdoms ruled by people of different faiths and cultures, including the Oxus civilization, Andronovo culture, Buddhism, Nestorian Christianity, Hinduism, Zoroastrianism, Manichaeism, and Islam. The area has been ruled by numerous empires and dynasties, including the Achaemenid Empire, Sasanian Empire, Hephthalite Empire, Samanid Empire, and Mongol Empire. After being ruled by the Timurid Empire and Khanate of Bukhara, the Timurid Renaissance flourished. The region was later conquered by the Russian Empire and subsequently by the Soviet Union. Within the Soviet Union, the country's modern borders were drawn when it was part of Uzbekistan as an autonomous republic before becoming a full-fledged Soviet republic in 1929.

On 9 September 1991, Tajikistan declared itself an independent sovereign nation as the Soviet Union was disintegrating. A civil war was fought almost immediately after independence, lasting from 1992 to 1997. Since the end of the war, newly established political stability and foreign aid have allowed the country's economy to grow. The country has been led by President Emomali Rahmon since 1994, who rules an authoritarian regime. There is extensive corruption and widespread violations of human rights, including torture, arbitrary imprisonment, worsening political repression, and a lack of religious freedom and other civil liberties.

Tajikistan is a presidential republic consisting of four provinces. Most of Tajikistan's population belongs to the Tajik ethnic group, who speak the Tajik language — the first official language — making it one of the three Persian speaking countries alongside Afghanistan and Iran. Russian is used as the official inter-ethnic language. While the state is constitutionally secular, Islam is nominally adhered to by 96% of the population. In the Gorno-Badakhshan oblast, despite its sparse population, there is large linguistic diversity where Rushani, Shughni, Ishkashimi, Wakhi and Tajik are some of the languages spoken. Mountains cover more than 90% of the country. It is a developing country with a transitional economy that is highly dependent on remittances, aluminium and cotton production. Tajikistan is a member of the United Nations, CIS, OSCE, OIC, ECO, SCO, and CSTO as well as a NATO PfP partner.

Etymology 

The term "Tajik" itself ultimately derives from the Middle Persian "Tāzīk", the Turkic rendition of the Arabic ethnonym Ṭayyi’, denoting a large Qahtanite Arab tribe who emigrated to Transoxiana region of Central Asia in the 7th century AD. Tajikistan appeared as Tadjikistan or Tadzhikistan in English prior to 1991. In Russian, there is no single letter "j" to represent the phoneme , and therefore , or dzh, is used. Tadzhikistan is the most common alternate spelling and is widely used in English literature derived from Russian sources. "Tadjikistan" is the spelling in French and can occasionally be found in English language texts. The way of writing Tajikistan in the Perso-Arabic script is: .

Even though the Library of Congress's 1997 Country Study of Tajikistan found it difficult to definitively state the origins of the word "Tajik" because the term is "embroiled in twentieth-century political disputes about whether Turkic or Iranian peoples were the original inhabitants of Central Asia," most scholars concluded that contemporary Tajiks are the descendants of the ancient Eastern Iranian inhabitants of Central Asia, in particular, the Sogdians and the Bactrians, and possibly other groups, with an admixture of Western Iranian Persians and non-Iranian peoples. According to Richard Nelson Frye, a leading historian of Iranian and Central Asian history, the Persian emigration to Central Asia may be considered the beginning of the modern Tajik nation, and ethnic Persians, along with some elements of the Eastern Iranian Bactrians and Sogdians, as the main ancestors of the modern Tajiks. In later works, Frye expands on the complexity of the historical origins of the Tajiks. In a 1996 publication, Frye explains that many "factors must be taken into account in explaining the evolution of the peoples whose remnants are the Tajiks in Central Asia" and that "the peoples of Central Asia, whether Iranian or Turkic speaking, have one culture, one religion, one set of social values and traditions with only language separating them."

Regarding Tajiks, the Encyclopædia Britannica states:

History

Early history 

Cultures in the region have been dated back to at least the fourth millennium BC, including the Bronze Age Bactria–Margiana Archaeological Complex, the Andronovo cultures and the pro-urban site of Sarazm, a UNESCO World Heritage Site.

The earliest recorded history of the region dates back to about 500 BC when much, if not all, of modern Tajikistan, was part of the Achaemenid Empire. Some authors have also suggested that in the seventh and sixth centuries BC, parts of modern Tajikistan, including territories in the Zeravshan valley, formed part of the ancient Hindu Kambojas tribe before it became part of the Achaemenid Empire.
After the region's conquest by Alexander the Great it became part of the Greco-Bactrian Kingdom, a successor state of Alexander's empire. Northern Tajikistan (the cities of Khujand and Panjakent) was part of Sogdia, a collection of city-states which was overrun by Scythians and Yuezhi nomadic tribes around 150 BC. The Silk Road passed through the region and following the expedition of Chinese explorer Zhang Qian during the reign of Wudi (141BC–87 BC) commercial relations between Han Empire and Sogdiana flourished. Sogdians played a major role in facilitating trade and also worked in other capacities, as farmers, carpetweavers, glassmakers, and woodcarvers.

The Kushan Empire, a collection of Yuezhi tribes, took control of the region in the first century AD and ruled until the fourth century AD during which time Buddhism, Nestorian Christianity, Zoroastrianism, and Manichaeism were all practised in the region. Later the Hephthalite Empire, a collection of nomadic tribes, moved into the region and Arabs brought Islam in the early eighth century. Central Asia continued in its role as a commercial crossroads, linking China, the steppes to the north, and the Islamic heartland.

 It was briefly under the control of the Tibetan Empire and the Tang dynasty from 650 to 680 CE and then under the control of the Umayyads in 710 CE.

Samanid Empire 

The Samanid Empire, 819 to 999, restored Persian control of the region and enlarged the cities of Samarkand and Bukhara (both cities are today part of Uzbekistan) which became the cultural centers of Iran and the region was known as Khorasan. The empire was centered in Khorasan and Transoxiana; at its greatest extent encompassing modern-day Afghanistan, large parts of Iran, Tajikistan, Turkmenistan, Uzbekistan, Kyrgyzstan, parts of Kazakhstan, and Pakistan. Four brothers Nuh, Ahmad, Yahya, and Ilyas founded the Samanid state. Each of them ruled territory under Abbasid suzerainty. In 892, Ismail Samani (892–907) united the Samanid state under one ruler, thus effectively putting an end to the feudal system used by the Samanids. It was also under him that the Samanids became independent of Abbasid authority. The Kara-Khanid Khanate conquered Transoxania (which corresponds approximately with modern-day Uzbekistan, Tajikistan, southern Kyrgyzstan, and southwest Kazakhstan) and ruled between 999 and 1211. Their arrival in Transoxania signalled a definitive shift from Iranian to Turkic predominance in Central Asia, but gradually the Kara-khanids became assimilated into the Perso-Arab Muslim culture of the region.

In the 13th century, the Mongol Empire swept through Central Asia, invaded Khwarezmian Empire and sacked the cities, looting and massacring people everywhere. Turco-Mongol conqueror Tamerlane founded the Timurid Empire in and around modern-day Tajikistan and Central Asia, becoming the first ruler of the Timurid dynasty.

Bukharan rule 

Modern Tajikistan fell under the rule of the Khanate of Bukhara during the 16th century and with the empire's collapse in the 18th century it came under the rule of both the Emirate of Bukhara and Khanate of Kokand. The Emirate of Bukhara remained intact until the 20th century but during the 19th century, for the second time in world history, a European power (the Russian Empire) began to conquer parts of the region.

Imperial Russia 

Russian Imperialism led to the Russian Empire's conquest of Central Asia during the late 19th century's Imperial Era. Between 1864 and 1885, Russia gradually took control of the entire territory of Russian Turkestan, the Tajikistan portion of which had been controlled by the Emirate of Bukhara and Khanate of Kokand. Russia was interested in gaining access to a supply of cotton and in the 1870s attempted to switch cultivation in the region from grain to cotton (a strategy later copied and expanded by the Soviets). By 1885 Tajikistan's territory was either ruled by the Russian Empire or its vassal state, the Emirate of Bukhara, nevertheless Tajiks felt little Russian influence.

During the late 19th century, the Jadidists established themselves as an Islamic social movement throughout the region. Although the Jadidists were pro-modernization and not necessarily anti-Russian, the Russians viewed the movement as a threat because the Russian Empire was predominantly Christian. Russian troops were required to restore order during uprisings against the Khanate of Kokand between 1910 and 1913. Further violence occurred in July 1916 when demonstrators attacked Russian soldiers in Khujand over the threat of forced conscription during World War I. Despite Russian troops quickly bringing Khujand back under control, clashes continued throughout the year in various locations in Tajikistan.

Soviet period 

After the Russian Revolution of 1917 guerrillas throughout Central Asia, known as basmachi, waged a war against Bolshevik armies in an attempt to maintain independence. The Bolsheviks prevailed after a four-year war, in which mosques and villages were burned down and the population heavily suppressed. Soviet authorities started a campaign of secularisation. Practising Islam, Judaism, and Christianity was discouraged and repressed, and many mosques, churches, and synagogues were closed. As a consequence of the conflict and Soviet agriculture policies, Central Asia, Tajikistan included, suffered a famine that claimed many lives.

In 1924, the Tajik Autonomous Soviet Socialist Republic was created as a part of Uzbekistan, but in 1929 the Tajik Soviet Socialist Republic (Tajik SSR) was made a separate constituent republic; however, the predominantly ethnic Tajik cities of Samarkand and Bukhara remained in the Uzbek SSR. Between 1927 and 1934, collectivisation of agriculture and a rapid expansion of cotton production took place, especially in the southern region. Soviet collectivisation policy brought violence against peasants and forced resettlement occurred throughout Tajikistan. Consequently, some peasants fought collectivization and revived the Basmachi movement. Some small scale industrial development also occurred during this time along with the expansion of irrigation infrastructure.

Two rounds of Stalin's purges (1927–1934 and 1937–1938) resulted in the expulsion of nearly 10,000 people, from all levels of the Communist Party of Tajikistan. Ethnic Russians were sent in to replace those expelled and subsequently Russians dominated party positions at all levels, including the top position of first secretary. Between 1926 and 1959 the proportion of Russians among Tajikistan's population grew from less than 1% to 13%. Bobojon Ghafurov, First Secretary of the Communist Party of Tajikistan from 1946 to 1956, was the only Tajik politician of significance outside of the country during the Soviet Era. He was followed in office by Tursun Uljabayev (1956–61), Jabbor Rasulov (1961–1982), and Rahmon Nabiyev (1982–1985, 1991–1992).

Tajiks began to be conscripted into the Soviet Army in 1939 and during World War II around 260,000 Tajik citizens fought against Germany, Finland and Japan. Between 60,000 (4%) and 120,000 (8%) of Tajikistan's 1,530,000 citizens were killed during World War II. Following the war and Stalin's reign, attempts were made to further expand the agriculture and industry of Tajikistan. During 1957–58 Nikita Khrushchev's Virgin Lands Campaign focused attention on Tajikistan, where living conditions, education and industry lagged behind the other Soviet Republics. In the 1980s, Tajikistan had the lowest household saving rate in the USSR, the lowest percentage of households in the two top per capita income groups, and the lowest rate of university graduates per 1000 people. By the late 1980s Tajik nationalists were calling for increased rights. Real disturbances did not occur within the republic until 1990. The following year, the Soviet Union collapsed, and Tajikistan declared its independence on 9 September 1991, a day which is now celebrated as the country's Independence Day.

Independence 

After the beginning of the Perestroika era, declared by Mikhail Gorbachev throughout the USSR, supporters of the independence of the republics began to speak openly and freely. In Tajikistan SSR, the independence movement had been active since 1987. Supporters of independence were the Islamic Renaissance Party of Tajikistan, the Democratic Party of Tajikistan and the national democratic Rastokhez (Revival) Movement. On the eve of the collapse of the USSR, the population of Tajikistan SSR was divided into two camps. The first wanted independence for Tajikistan, the restoration of Tajik culture and language, the restoration of political and cultural relations with Iran and Afghanistan and other countries, and the second part of the population opposed independence, considering it the best option to remain part of the USSR. During the 1991 Soviet Union Referendum (the first internationally observed referendum in the country's history) on continuing the Soviet system and the Soviet Union itself, nearly 97% of voters in Tajikistan approved of Question 1: "Do you consider it necessary to preserve the USSR as a renewed federation of equal sovereign republics, which will be fully ensured of human rights and freedoms of any nationality?", though by dissolution in December of the same year, a significant proportion of Tajikistan's population supported what was by then the fait accompli of independence for the union-level republics of the Soviet Union.

In February 1990, riots and strikes in Dushanbe and other cities began due to the difficult socio-economic situation, lack of housing, and youth unemployment. The nationalist and democratic opposition and supporters of independence joined the strikes and began to demand the independence of the republic and democratic reforms. Islamists also began to hold strikes to demand respect for their rights and independence of the republic. The Soviet leadership introduced Internal Troops in Dushanbe to eliminate the unrest.

Post-independence 

Almost immediately following independence, the nation fell into civil war among various factions; often distinguished by clan loyalties. More than 500,000 residents fled during this time because of persecution, increased poverty and better economic opportunities in the West or in other former Soviet republics. Emomali Rahmon came to power in 1992, defeating former prime minister Abdumalik Abdullajanov in a November presidential election with 58% of the vote. The elections took place shortly after the end of the war, and Tajikistan was in a state of complete devastation. The estimated dead numbered over 100,000. Around 1.2 million people were refugees inside and outside of the country. In 1997, a ceasefire was reached between Rahmon and opposition parties under the guidance of Gerd D. Merrem, Special Representative to the Secretary General, a result widely praised as a successful United Nations peacekeeping initiative. The ceasefire guaranteed 30% of ministerial positions would go to the opposition. Elections were held in 1999, though they were criticised by opposition parties and foreign observers as unfair and Rahmon was re-elected with 98% of the vote. Elections in 2006 were again won by Rahmon (with 79% of the vote) and he began his third term in office. Several opposition parties boycotted the 2006 election and the Organization for Security and Cooperation in Europe (OSCE) criticised it, although observers from the Commonwealth of Independent States claimed the elections were legal and transparent. Rahmon's administration came under further criticism from the OSCE in October 2010 for its censorship and repression of the media. The OSCE claimed that the Tajik Government censored Tajik and foreign websites and instituted tax inspections on independent printing houses that led to the cessation of printing activities for a number of independent newspapers.

Russian border troops were stationed along the Tajik–Afghan border until summer 2005. Since the September 11, 2001 attacks, French troops have been stationed at Dushanbe Airport in support of air operations of NATO's International Security Assistance Force in Afghanistan. United States Army and Marine Corps personnel periodically visit Tajikistan to conduct joint training missions of up to several weeks duration. The Government of India rebuilt the Ayni Air Base, a military airport located 15 km southwest of Dushanbe, at a cost of $70 million, completing the repairs in September 2010. It is now the main base of the Tajikistan air force. There have been talks with Russia concerning use of the Ayni facility, and Russia continues to maintain a large base on the outskirts of Dushanbe.

In 2010, there were concerns among Tajik officials that Islamic militarism in the east of the country was on the rise following the escape of 25 militants from a Tajik prison in August, an ambush that killed 28 Tajik soldiers in the Rasht Valley in September, and another ambush in the valley in October that killed 30 soldiers, followed by fighting outside Gharm that left 3 militants dead. To date the country's Interior Ministry asserts that the central government maintains full control over the country's east, and the military operation in the Rasht Valley was concluded in November 2010. However, fighting erupted again in July 2012.
In 2015, Russia sent more troops to Tajikistan.

In May 2015, Tajikistan's national security suffered a serious setback when Colonel Gulmurod Khalimov, commander of the special-purpose police unit (OMON) of the Interior Ministry, defected to the Islamic State.

In 2021, following the Fall of Kabul, Tajikistan allegedly got involved in the Panjshir conflict against the Taliban on the side of the National Resistance Front of Afghanistan.

In September 2022 armed clashes, including the use of artillery, erupted along much of the border between Kyrgyzstan and Tajikistan.

Politics 

Almost immediately after independence, Tajikistan was plunged into a civil war that saw various factions fighting one another. These factions were supported by foreign countries including Afghanistan, Iran, Pakistan, Uzbekistan and Russia. Russia and Iran focused on keeping peace in the warring nation to decrease the chances of U.S. or Turkish involvement. Most notably, Russia backed the pro-government faction and deployed troops from the Commonwealth of Independent States to guard the Tajikistan-Afghan border. All but 25,000 of the more than 400,000 ethnic Russians, who were mostly employed in industry, fled to Russia. By 1997, the war had ended after a peace agreement between the government and the Islamist-led opposition, a central government began to take form, with peaceful elections in 1999.

"Longtime observers of Tajikistan often characterize the country as profoundly averse to risk and skeptical of promises of reform, a political passivity they trace to the country's ruinous civil war," Ilan Greenberg wrote in a news article in The New York Times just before the country's November 2006 presidential election.

Tajikistan is officially a republic, and holds elections for the presidency and parliament, operating under a presidential system. It is, however, a dominant-party system, where the People's Democratic Party of Tajikistan routinely has a vast majority in Parliament. Emomali Rahmon has held the office of President of Tajikistan continuously since November 1994. The Prime Minister is Kokhir Rasulzoda, the First Deputy Prime Minister is Matlubkhon Davlatov and the two Deputy Prime Ministers are Murodali Alimardon and Ruqiya Qurbanova.

The parliamentary elections of 2005 aroused many accusations from opposition parties and international observers that President Emomali Rahmon corruptly manipulates the election process and unemployment. The most recent elections, in February 2010, saw the ruling PDPT lose four seats in Parliament, yet still maintain a comfortable majority. The Organization for Security and Co-operation in Europe election observers said the 2010 polling "failed to meet many key OSCE commitments" and that "these elections failed on many basic democratic standards." The government insisted that only minor violations had occurred, which would not affect the will of the Tajik people.

The Tajik government has reportedly clamped down on facial hair as part of a crackdown on Islamic influence and due to its perceived associations with Islamic extremism, which is prevalent in bordering Afghanistan.

The presidential election held on 6 November 2006 was boycotted by "mainline" opposition parties, including the 23,000-member Islamic Renaissance Party. Four remaining opponents "all but endorsed the incumbent", Rahmon.

Freedom of the press is ostensibly officially guaranteed by the government, but independent press outlets remain restricted, as does a substantial amount of web content. According to the Institute for War & Peace Reporting, access is blocked to local and foreign websites including avesta.tj, Tjknews.com, centrasia.org and journalists are often obstructed from reporting on controversial events. In practice, no public criticism of the regime is tolerated and all direct protest is severely suppressed and does not receive coverage in the local media.

In the Economist's democracy index report of 2020, Tajikistan is placed 160th, just after Saudi Arabia, as an "authoritarian regime".

In July 2019, UN ambassadors of 37 countries, including Tajikistan, signed a joint letter to the UNHRC defending China's treatment of Uyghurs in the Xinjiang region.

In October 2020, Tajikistan's authoritarian President Emomali Rahmon was re-elected for another seven-year period with 90 per cent of the votes, following a tightly controlled and largely ceremonial election.

In late April 2021, a conflict over water with Kyrgyzstan escalated into one of the most serious border clashes between the two countries since independence.

In July 2021, Tajikistan appealed to members of a Russian-led Collective Security Treaty Organization (CSTO) of ex-Soviet states for help in dealing with security challenges emerging from neighboring Afghanistan. The safety concerns emerged as foreign troops such as the US and British army exited the country, causing over 1,000 Afghan civilians and servicemen to flee to neighboring Tajikistan after Taliban insurgents took control of many parts of Afghanistan.

Geography 

Tajikistan is landlocked, and is the smallest nation in Central Asia by area. The only major areas of lower land are in the north (part of the Fergana Valley), and in the southern Kofarnihon and Vakhsh river valleys, which form the Amu Darya. Dushanbe is located on the southern slopes above the Kofarnihon valley.

The Amu Darya and Panj rivers mark the border with Afghanistan, and the glaciers in Tajikistan's mountains are the major source of runoff for the Aral Sea. There are over 900 rivers in Tajikistan longer than 10 kilometres.

Administrative divisions 

Tajikistan consists of four administrative divisions. These are the provinces (viloyat) of Sughd and Khatlon, the autonomous province of Gorno-Badakhshan (abbreviated as GBAO), and the Region of Republican Subordination (RRP – Raiony Respublikanskogo Podchineniya in transliteration from Russian or NTJ – Ноҳияҳои тобеи ҷумҳурӣ in Tajik; formerly known as Karotegin Province). Each region is divided into several districts (nohiya or raion), which in turn are subdivided into jamoats (village-level self-governing units) and then villages (qyshloqs). , there were 58 districts and 367 jamoats in Tajikistan.

Lakes 

About 2% of the country's area is covered by lakes, the best known of which are the following:
Kayrakum (Qairoqqum) Reservoir (Sughd)
Iskanderkul (Fann Mountains)
Kulikalon (Kul-i Kalon) (Fann Mountains)
Nurek Reservoir (Khatlon)
Karakul (Kyrgyz: Кара-Көл; eastern Pamir)
Sarez (Pamir)
Shadau Lake (Pamir)
Zorkul (Pamir)

Biodiversity
Tajikistan contains five terrestrial ecoregions: Alai-Western Tian Shan steppe, Gissaro-Alai open woodlands, Pamir alpine desert and tundra, Badghyz and Karabil semi-desert, and Paropamisus xeric woodlands.

Economy 

In 2019, nearly 29% of Tajikistan's GDP came from immigrant remittances (mostly from Tajiks working in Russia), one of the highest rates in the world. The current economic situation remains fragile, largely owing to corruption, uneven economic reforms, and economic mismanagement. With foreign revenue precariously dependent upon remittances from migrant workers overseas and exports of aluminium and cotton, the economy is highly vulnerable to external shocks. In fiscal year 2000, international assistance remained an essential source of support for rehabilitation programs that reintegrated former civil war combatants into the civilian economy, which helped keep the peace. International assistance also was necessary to address the second year of severe drought that resulted in a continued shortfall of food production. On 21 August 2001, the Red Cross announced that a famine was striking Tajikistan, and called for international aid for Tajikistan and Uzbekistan; however, access to food remains a problem today. In January 2012, 680,152 of the people living in Tajikistan were living with food insecurity. Out of those, 676,852 were at risk of Phase 3 (Acute Food and Livelihoods Crisis) food insecurity, and 3,300 were at risk of Phase 4 (Humanitarian Emergency). Those with the highest risk of food insecurity were living in the remote Murghob District of GBAO.

Tajikistan's economy grew substantially after the war. The GDP of Tajikistan expanded at an average rate of 9.6% over the period of 2000–2007 according to the World Bank data. This improved Tajikistan's position among other Central Asian countries (namely Turkmenistan and Uzbekistan), which seem to have degraded economically ever since. The primary sources of income in Tajikistan are aluminium production, cotton growing and remittances from migrant workers. Cotton accounts for 60% of agricultural output, supporting 75% of the rural population, and using 45% of irrigated arable land. The aluminium industry is represented by the state-owned Tajik Aluminum Company – the biggest aluminium plant in Central Asia and one of the biggest in the world.

Tajikistan's rivers, such as the Vakhsh and the Panj, have great hydropower potential, and the government has focused on attracting investment for projects for internal use and electricity exports. Tajikistan is home to the Nurek Dam, the second highest dam in the world. Lately, Russia's RAO UES energy giant has been working on the Sangtuda-1 hydroelectric power station (670 MW capacity) commenced operations on 18 January 2008. A planned project, CASA-1000, will transmit 1000 MW of surplus electricity from Tajikistan to Pakistan with power transit through Afghanistan. The total length of transmission line is 750 km while the project is planned to be on Public-Private Partnership basis with the support of WB, IFC, ADB and IDB. The project cost is estimated to be around US$865 million. Other energy resources include sizeable coal deposits and smaller, relatively unexplored reserves of natural gas and petroleum.

In 2014 Tajikistan was the world's most remittance-dependent economy with remittances accounting for 49% of GDP and expected to fall by 40% in 2015 due to the economic crisis in the Russian Federation. Tajik migrant workers abroad, mainly in the Russian Federation, have become by far the main source of income for millions of Tajikistan's people and with the 2014–2015 downturn in the Russian economy the World Bank has predicted large numbers of young Tajik men will return home and face few economic prospects.

According to some estimates about 20% of the population lives on less than US$1.25 per day. Migration from Tajikistan and the consequent remittances have been unprecedented in their magnitude and economic impact. In 2010, remittances from Tajik labour migrants totalled an estimated $2.1 billion US dollars, an increase from 2009. Tajikistan has achieved transition from a planned to a market economy without substantial and protracted recourse to aid (of which it by now receives only negligible amounts), and by purely market-based means, simply by exporting its main commodity of comparative advantage — cheap labour. The World Bank Tajikistan Policy Note 2006 concludes that remittances have played an important role as one of the drivers of Tajikistan's economic growth during the past several years, have increased incomes, and as a result helped significantly reduce poverty.

Drug trafficking is the major illegal source of income in Tajikistan as it is an important transit country for Afghan narcotics bound for Russian and, to a lesser extent, Western European markets; some opium poppy is also raised locally for the domestic market.  However, with the increasing assistance from international organisations, such as UNODC, and co-operation with the US, Russian, EU and Afghan authorities a level of progress on the fight against illegal drug-trafficking is being achieved. Tajikistan holds third place in the world for heroin and raw opium confiscations (1216.3 kg of heroin and 267.8 kg of raw opium in the first half of 2006). Drug money corrupts the country's government; according to some experts the well-known personalities that fought on both sides of the civil war and have held the positions in the government after the armistice was signed are now involved in the drug trade. UNODC is working with Tajikistan to strengthen border crossings, provide training, and set up joint interdiction teams. It also helped to establish Tajikistani Drug Control Agency. Tajikistan is also an active member of the Economic Cooperation Organization (ECO).

Besides Russia, China is one of the major economic and trade partners of Dushanbe. Tajikistan belongs to the group of countries associated with Chinese investment within the Belt and Road Initiative.

Transportation 

In 2013 Tajikistan, like many of the other Central Asian countries, was experiencing major development in its transportation sector.

As a landlocked country, Tajikistan has no ports and the majority of transportation is via roads, air, and rail. In recent years Tajikistan has pursued agreements with Iran and Pakistan to gain port access in those countries via Afghanistan. In 2009, an agreement was made between Tajikistan, Pakistan, and Afghanistan to improve and build a  highway and rail system connecting the three countries to Pakistan's ports. The proposed route would go through the Gorno-Badakhshan Autonomous Province in the eastern part of the country. And in 2012, the presidents of Tajikistan, Afghanistan, and Iran signed an agreement to construct roads and railways as well as oil, gas, and water pipelines to connect the three countries.

Rail 

The railroad system totals only  of track, all of it  broad gauge. The principal segments are in the southern region and connect the capital with the industrial areas of the Hisor and Vakhsh valleys and with Uzbekistan, Turkmenistan, Kazakhstan and Russia. Most international freight traffic is carried by train. The recently constructed Bokhtar–Kulob railway connected the Kulob District with the central area of the country.

Air 

In 2009 Tajikistan had 26 airports, 18 of which had paved runways, of which two had runways longer than 3,000 meters. The country's main airport is Dushanbe International Airport, which as of April 2015 had regularly scheduled flights to major cities in Russia, Central Asia, as well as Delhi, Dubai, Frankfurt, Istanbul, Kabul, Tehran, and Ürümqi, amongst others. There are also international flights, mainly to Russia, from Khujand Airport in the northern part of the country as well as limited international services from Kulob Airport, and Bokhtar International Airport. Khorog Airport is a domestic airport and also the only airport in the sparsely populated eastern half of the country.

Tajikistan has one major airline (Somon Air) and is also serviced by over a dozen foreign airlines.

Roads 
The total length of roads in the country is 27,800 kilometres. Automobiles account for more than 90% of the total volume of passenger transportation and more than 80% of domestic freight transportation. Opel passenger cars are most popular.

In 2004 the Tajik–Afghan Friendship Bridge between Afghanistan and Tajikistan was built, improving the country's access to South Asia. The bridge was built by the United States.

 many highway and tunnel construction projects are underway or have recently been completed. Major projects include rehabilitation of the Dushanbe – Chanak (Uzbek border), Dushanbe – Kulma (Chinese border), and Kurgan-Tube – Nizhny Pyanj (Afghan border) highways, and construction of tunnels under the mountain passes of Anzob, Shakhristan, Shar-Shar and Chormaghzak. These were supported by international donor countries.

Demographics 

In 2021, Tajikistan was estimated to have a population of 9,749,625 as per the World Bank data. The Tajiks who speak Tajik (a dialect of Persian) are the main ethnic group, although there are sizeable minorities of Uzbeks and Russians, whose numbers are declining due to emigration. The Pamiris of Badakhshan, a small population of Yaghnobi people, and a sizeable minority of Ismailis are all considered to belong to the larger group of Tajiks. All citizens of Tajikistan are called Tajikistanis.

In 1989, ethnic Russians in Tajikistan made up 7.6% of the population; by 1998 the proportion had reduced to approximately 0.5% following the Tajikistani Civil War which had displaced the majority of ethnic Russians. Following the end of the war, Russian emigration continued. The ethnic German population of Tajikistan has also declined due to emigration: having topped at 38,853 in 1979, it has almost vanished since the collapse of the Soviet Union.

The Tajiks are the principal ethnic group in most of Tajikistan, as well as in northern and western Afghanistan, and there are more Tajiks in Afghanistan than in Tajikistan. Tajiks are a substantial minority in Uzbekistan. More than 3 million Tajik citizens were officially registered in Russia in 2021.

Languages 

The two official languages of Tajikistan are Tajik as the state language and Russian as the interethnic language, as understood in Article 2 of the Constitution: "The state language of Tajikistan shall be Tajik. Russian shall be the language of international communication."

The state (national) language of the Republic of Tajikistan is Tajik, which is written in the Tajik Cyrillic alphabet. Several linguists recognise the fact that the Tajik language is a variant of the Persian language (or Farsi). Therefore, Tajik speakers have no problems communicating with Persian speakers from Iran and Dari speakers from Afghanistan. Several million native Tajik speakers also live in neighboring Uzbekistan and in Russia.

According to article 2 of the Constitution of the Republic of Tajikistan, Russian is recognized as the second official language of Tajikistan; the official language of inter-ethnic communication in the country. Russian had previously lost its official status after Tajikistan's independence in late 1991, which was then restored with the Constitution.

Approximately 90% of the population of Tajikistan speaks Russian at various levels. The varieties of Russian spoken in Tajikistan are referred to by scholars as Tajik(istani) Russian  and it shares some similarities with Uzbek(istani) Russian, such as morphological differences and the lexical differences like the use of words урюк for a wild apricot or кислушка for rhubarb. Previously, from the creation of the Tajikistan SSR until Tajik became the official language of the Tajikistan Soviet Socialist Republic on July 22, 1989, the only official language of the republic was the Russian language, and the Tajik language had only the status of the “national language”.

Both Russian and Tajik speakers in the country use the following words in common in address to unfamiliar people and acquaintances.

The highly educated part of the population of Tajikistan, as well as the intelligentsia, prefer to speak Russian and Persian, the pronunciation of which in Tajikistan is called the “Iranian style”.

Apart from Russian, Uzbek is actually the second most widely spoken language in Tajikistan after Tajik. Native Uzbek speakers live in the north and west of Tajikistan. In fourth place (after Tajik, Russian and Uzbek) by number of native speakers are various Pamir languages, whose native speakers live in Kuhistani Badakshshan Autonomous Region. The majority of Zoroastrians in Tajikistan speak one of the Pamir languages. Native speakers of the Kyrgyz language live in the north of Kuhistani Badakshshan Autonomous Region. Yagnobi language speakers live in the west of the country. The Parya language of local Romani people (Central Asian Gypsies) is also widely spoken in Tajikistan. Tajikistan also has small communities of native speakers of Persian, Arabic, Pashto, Eastern Armenian, Azerbaijani, Tatar, Turkmen, Kazakh, Chinese, Ukrainian.

Among foreign languages, the most popular is English, which is taught in schools in Tajikistan as one of the foreign languages. Some young people, as well as those working in the tourism sector of Tajikistan, speak English at different levels. Of the European languages, there are also a number of native speakers of German and French. Many among the Uzbek population learn Turkish in addition to Russian.

Employment 
In 2009 nearly one million Tajiks worked abroad (mainly in Russia). More than 70% of the female population lives in traditional villages.

Culture 

The Tajik language is the mother tongue of around 80% of the citizens of Tajikistan. The main urban centres in today's Tajikistan include Dushanbe (the capital), Khujand, Kulob, Panjakent, Bokhtar, Khorugh and Istaravshan. There are also Uzbek, Kyrgyz and Russian minorities.

The Pamiri people of Gorno-Badakhshan Autonomous Province in the southeast, bordering Afghanistan and China, though considered part of the Tajik ethnicity, nevertheless are distinct linguistically and culturally from most Tajiks. In contrast to the mostly Sunni Muslim residents of the rest of Tajikistan, the Pamiris overwhelmingly follow the Ismaili branch of Shia Islam, and speak a number of Eastern Iranian languages, including Shughni, Rushani, Khufi and Wakhi. Isolated in the highest parts of the Pamir Mountains, they have preserved many ancient cultural traditions and folk arts that have been largely lost elsewhere in the country.

The Yaghnobi people live in mountainous areas of northern Tajikistan. The estimated number of Yaghnobis is now about 25,000. Forced migrations in the 20th century decimated their numbers. They speak the Yaghnobi language, which is the only direct modern descendant of the ancient Sogdian language.

Tajikistan artisans created the Dushanbe Tea House, which was presented in 1988 as a gift to the sister city of Boulder, Colorado.

In the country, especially among women from the indigenous population, the wearing traditional national clothing is preserved. The seamstresses and embroiderers of various regions of Tajikistan use modern factory fabrics and local needlework embroidery for home decoration and women's clothing. The practice of Chakan embroidery is preserved among women in certain areas, passing the knowledge down from one generation to the next. Men mainly carry the factory clothing of European style. Some men wear upper national clothes — Jom (Taj. Ҷom), and hats — Tubetsey (Taj. Tқиi).

Religion 

Tajikistan considers itself a secular state with a constitution providing for freedom of religion. Sunni Islam of the Hanafi school has been officially recognised by the government since 2009. The government has declared two Islamic holidays, Eid ul-Fitr and Eid al-Adha, as state holidays. According to a US State Department release and Pew research group, the population of Tajikistan is 98% Muslim. Approximately 87–95% of them are Sunni and roughly 3% are Shia and roughly 7% are non-denominational Muslims. The Shia part of the population predominantly live in the Gorno-Badakhshan Autonomous Region, and are followers of the Ismailite branch of Shia Islam. The remaining 2% of the population are followers of Russian Orthodoxy, Protestantism, Zoroastrianism and Buddhism. Many Muslims fast during Ramadan, although only about one third in the countryside and 10% in the cities observe daily prayer and dietary restrictions.

Bukharan Jews had lived in Tajikistan since the second century BC, but today almost none are left. In the 1940s, the Jewish community of Tajikistan numbered nearly 30,000 people. Most were Persian-speaking Bukharan Jews who had lived in the region for millennia along with Ashkenazi Jews from Eastern Europe who resettled there in the Soviet era. The Jewish population is now estimated at less than 500, about half of whom live in Dushanbe.

Relationships between religious groups are generally amicable, although there is some concern among mainstream Muslim leaders that minority religious groups undermine national unity. There is a concern for religious institutions becoming active in the political sphere. The Islamic Renaissance Party (IRP), a major combatant in the 1992–1997 Civil War and then-proponent of the creation of an Islamic state in Tajikistan, constitutes no more than 30% of the government by statute.  Membership in Hizb ut-Tahrir, a militant Islamic party which today aims for an overthrow of secular governments and the unification of Tajiks under one Islamic state, is illegal and members are subject to arrest and imprisonment. Numbers of large mosques appropriate for Friday prayers are limited and some feel this is discriminatory.

By law, religious communities must register by the State Committee on Religious Affairs (SCRA) and with local authorities. Registration with the SCRA requires a charter, a list of 10 or more members, and evidence of local government approval prayer site location. Religious groups that do not have a physical structure are not allowed to gather publicly for prayer. Failure to register can result in large fines and closure of a place of worship. There are reports that registration on the local level is sometimes difficult to obtain. People under the age of 18 are also barred from public religious practice.

As of January 2016, as part of an "anti-radicalisation campaign", police in the Khatlon region reportedly shaved the beards of 13,000 men and shut down 160 shops selling the hijab. Shaving beards and discouraging women from wearing hijabs is part of a government campaign targeting trends that are deemed "alien and inconsistent with Tajik culture", and "to preserve secular traditions".

Today, approximately 1.6% of the population in Tajikistan is Christian, mostly Orthodox Christians. The territory of Tajikistan is part of the Dushanbe and Tajikistan Diocese of the Central Asian Metropolitan District of the Russian Orthodox Moscow Patriarchate. The country is also home to communities of Catholics, Armenian Christians, Protestants, Lutherans, Jehovah's Witnesses, Baptists, Mormons, and Adventists.

Health 

Despite repeated efforts by the Tajik government to improve and expand health care, the system remains among the most underdeveloped and poor, with severe shortages of medical supplies. The state's Ministry of Labor and Social Welfare reported that 104,272 disabled people are registered in Tajikistan (2000). This group of people suffers most from poverty in Tajikistan. The government of Tajikistan and the World Bank considered activities to support this part of the population described in the World Bank's Poverty Reduction Strategy Paper. Public expenditure on health was at 1% of the GDP in 2004.

Life expectancy at birth was estimated to be 69 years in 2020. The infant mortality rate was approximately 30.42 deaths per 1,000 children in 2018. In 2014, there were 2.1 physicians per 1,000 people, higher than any other low-income country after North Korea.

Tajikistan has experienced a sharp decrease in number of per capita hospital beds following the dissolution of the USSR (since 1992), even though the number still remains relatively at 4.8 beds per 1,000 people, well above the world average of 2.7 and one of the highest among other low-income countries.

According to World Bank, 96% of births are attended by skilled health staff, a figure which has risen from 66.6% in 1999.

In 2010 the country experienced an outbreak of polio that caused more than 457 cases of polio in both children and adults and resulted in 29 deaths before being brought under control.

In the summer of 2021 coronavirus ravaged the country, and the Tajik president's sister reportedly died in a hospital of COVID-19. According to local media, the president's sisters sons physically assaulted the health minister and a senior doctor.

Education 

Despite its poverty, Tajikistan has a high rate of literacy due to the old Soviet system of free education, with an estimated 99.8% of the population having the ability to read and write.

Public education in Tajikistan consists of 11 years of primary and secondary education but the government planned to implement a 12-year system in 2016. There is a relatively large number of tertiary education institutions including Khujand State University which has 76 departments in 15 faculties, Tajikistan State University of Law, Business, & Politics, Khorugh State University, Agricultural University of Tajikistan, Tajik National University, and several other institutions. Most, but not all, universities were established during the Soviet Era.  tertiary education enrollment was 17%, significantly below the sub-regional average of 37%, although higher than any other low-income country after Syria. Many Tajiks left the education system due to low demand in the labour market for people with extensive educational training or professional skills.

Public spending on education was relatively constant between 2005–2012 and fluctuated from 3.5% to 4.1% of GDP significantly below the OECD average of 6%. The United Nations reported that the level of spending was "severely inadequate to meet the requirements of the country's high-needs education system."

According to a UNICEF-supported survey, about 25 percent of girls in Tajikistan fail to complete compulsory primary education because of poverty and gender bias, although literacy is generally high in Tajikistan. Estimates of out of school children range from 4.6% to 19.4% with the vast majority being girls.

In September 2017, the University of Central Asia launched its second campus in Khorog, Tajikistan, offering majors in Earth & Environmental Sciences and Economics. Tajikistan was ranked 103rd in the Global Innovation Index in 2021, down from 100th in 2019.

Science on the territory of Tajikistan achieved great success already in the Middle Ages, but the current scientific organizations were created in the Soviet period. During the period of independence, the scientific sphere experienced a severe crisis: the annual number of patent applications for inventions decreased in 1994-2011 from 193 to 5. A significant contribution to science is made by universities, where in 2011 6707 researchers worked, of which 2450 had academic degrees.

For the contribution of Tajik scientists to the development of world astrophysics, one of the minor planets of the solar system was named in honor of Tajikistan.

Sport 
The national sport of Tajikistan is gushtigiri, a form of traditional wrestling.

Another popular sport is buzkashi, a game played on horseback, like polo. Buzkashi may be played as an individual sport and as a team sport. The aim of the game is to grab a 50 kg dead goat, ride clear of the other players, get back to the starting point and drop it in a designated circle. It is also practised in Afghanistan, Kyrgyzstan, Kazakhstan, Uzbekistan and Turkmenistan. It is often played at Nowruz celebrations.

Tajikistan's mountains provide many opportunities for outdoor sports, such as hill-climbing, mountain biking, rock climbing, skiing, snowboarding, hiking, and mountain climbing. The facilities are limited, however. Mountain climbing and hiking tours to the Fann and Pamir Mountains, including the 7,000 m peaks in the region, are seasonally organised by local and international alpine agencies.

Football is the most popular sport in Tajikistan. It is governed by the Tajikistan Football Federation. The Tajikistan national football team competes in FIFA and AFC competitions. The top clubs in Tajikistan compete in the Tajik League.

The Tajikistan Cricket Federation was formed in 2012 as the governing body for the sport of cricket in Tajikistan. It was granted affiliate membership of the Asian Cricket Council in the same year.

Rugby union in Tajikistan is a minor but growing sport. In 2008, the sport was officially registered with the Ministry of Justice, and there are currently 3 men's clubs.

Four Tajikistani athletes have won Olympic medals for their country since independence. They are: wrestler Yusup Abdusalomov (silver in Beijing 2008), judoka Rasul Boqiev (bronze in Beijing 2008), boxer Mavzuna Chorieva (bronze in London 2012) and hammer thrower Dilshod Nazarov (gold in Rio de Janeiro 2016).

Khorugh, capital of Gorno-Badakhshan Autonomous Region, is the location of highest altitude where bandy has been played.

Tajikistan has also one ski resort, called Safed Dara (formerly Takob), near the town of Varzob.

See also 

2006 Tajikistan earthquake
Armed Forces of the Republic of Tajikistan
Central Asian Union
Dushanbe
Foreign relations of Tajikistan
Gorno-Badakhshan Autonomous Province
Ittihodi Scouthoi Tojikiston
List of cities in Tajikistan
LGBT rights in Tajikistan
Mount Imeon
Outline of Tajikistan
Russian Turkistan
Telecommunications in Tajikistan
Yaghnob Valley

References

Further reading 

 Kamoludin Abdullaev and Shahram Akbarzadeh, Historical Dictionary of Tajikistan, 3rd. ed., Rowman & Littlefield, 2018.
 Shirin Akiner, Mohammad-Reza Djalili and Frederic Grare, eds., Tajikistan: The Trials of Independence, Routledge, 1998.
 Richard Foltz, A History of the Tajiks: Iranians of the East, London: Bloomsbury Publishing, 2019.
 Robert Middleton, Huw Thomas and Markus Hauser, Tajikistan and the High Pamirs, Hong Kong: Odyssey Books, 2008.
 Nahaylo, Bohdan and Victor Swoboda. Soviet Disunion: A History of the Nationalities problem in the USSR (1990)  excerpt
 Kirill Nourdhzanov and Christian Blauer, Tajikistan: A Political and Social History, Canberra: ANU E-Press, 2013.
 Rashid, Ahmed. The Resurgence of Central Asia: Islam or Nationalism? (2017)
 Smith, Graham,  ed. The Nationalities Question in the Soviet Union (2nd ed. 1995)
 Monica Whitlock, Land Beyond the River: The Untold Story of Central Asia, New York: St. Martin's Press, 2003.
 Poopak NikTalab. Sarve Samarghand (Cedar of Samarkand), continuous interpretation of Rudaki's poems, Tehran 2020, Faradid Publications {Introduction}
 Sharma, Raj Kumar, "Food Security and Political Stability in Tajikistan", New Delhi, Vij Books, 2018.

External links 

 Tajikistan at UCB Libraries GovPubs
 Tajikistan. The World Factbook. Central Intelligence Agency.
 
 Tajikistan profile from the BBC News
 
 Key Development Forecasts for Tajikistan from International Futures
 Flight Information Region In Tajikistan

 
Central Asian countries
Landlocked countries
Member states of the Commonwealth of Independent States
Member states of the Organisation of Islamic Cooperation
Member states of the United Nations
Member States of the Collective Security Treaty Organization
Persian-speaking countries and territories
Russian-speaking countries and territories
States and territories established in 1991
1991 establishments in Asia
Countries in Asia
Member states of the Shanghai Cooperation Organisation